Alf's Button Afloat is a 1938 British comedy film directed by Marcel Varnel and starring Bud Flanagan, Chesney Allen, Jimmy Nervo, Alastair Sim and Peter Gawthorne. In the film, the Crazy Gang go to sea, where one of them discovers a button on his uniform is made from the metal of Aladdin's lamp. The film parodies the 1920 novel Alf's Button by W.A. Darlington and its subsequent film adaptations.

Cast
 Bud Flanagan as Alf Higgins
 Chesney Allen as Ches
 Jimmy Nervo as Cecil
 Teddy Knox as Teddy
 Charlie Naughton as Charlie
 Jimmy Gold as Jimmy
 Alastair Sim as Eustace
 Wally Patch as Sergeant Hawkins
 Peter Gawthorne as Captain Driscol
 Agnes Lauchlan as Lady Driscol
 Glennis Lorimer as Frankie Driscol
 James Carney as Lieutenant John Hardy
 Wilson Coleman as surgeon
 J.H. Roberts as Aladdin
 Bruce Winston as Mustapha
 Richard Cooper as Lord Wimbledon

References

External links
 

1938 films
1938 comedy films
1930s English-language films
British comedy films
Seafaring films
Films directed by Marcel Varnel
Films with screenplays by Marriott Edgar
British black-and-white films
1930s British films